Genlisea violacea is a corkscrew plant native to South America.

References

violacea
Carnivorous plants of South America
Flora of Brazil
Plants described in 1833